Michal Tomič (born 30 March 1999) is a Slovak professional footballer who plays as a defender for Czech club Mladá Boleslav on loan from Slavia Prague.

Club career

MŠK Žilina
Tomič made his Slovak Super Liga debut for Žilina against DAC Dunajská Streda on 25 August 2018. Seven minutes before stoppage time Tomič was replaced by Roland Gerebenits. The match concluded in a goal-less tie.

International career
Tomič was first recognised in Slovak senior national team nomination in November 2022 by Francesco Calzona being listed as an alternate for two friendly fixtures against Montenegro and Marek Hamšík's retirement game against Chile. However, his spot in the 27-man squad was short after taken by Matúš Rusnák as Tomič was not released for international duties by Slovácko. In December 2022, he was nominated for senior national team prospective players' training camp at NTC Senec.

Tomič first joined the national team in March 2023, when Calzona, once more, recognised him in the shortlisted nomination. This was Tomič's first competitive senior national team nomination, ahead of two home UEFA Euro 2024 qualifiers against Luxembourg and Bosnia and Herzegovina. Calzona named Tomič as one of the limited options for the right back position.

References

External links
 MŠK Žilina official club profile 
 
 Futbalnet profile 
 

1999 births
Living people
Sportspeople from Skalica
Slovak footballers
Slovak expatriate footballers
Slovakia youth international footballers
Slovakia under-21 international footballers
Association football defenders
U.C. Sampdoria players
MŠK Žilina players
1. FC Slovácko players
SK Slavia Prague players
FK Mladá Boleslav players
Slovak Super Liga players
Czech First League players
Expatriate footballers in Italy
Slovak expatriate sportspeople in Italy
Expatriate footballers in the Czech Republic
Slovak expatriate sportspeople in the Czech Republic